Saraswati Wildlife Sanctuary, also known as Seonsar Forest, is situated in Kaithal district of Haryana State, India.

Kalesar National Park, Morni Hills and Saraswati Wildlife Sanctuary are respectively first, second and third largest forest in Haryana.

Location

History
'Saraswati Plantation' was notified as Saraswati Wildlife Sanctuary on 29 July 1988. 'Saraswati Wildlife Sanctuary' was notified as Saraswati Conservation Reserve on 11 October 2007.

Archaeological remains
The Tribune reported on 9 April 2016 that Mahant and members of a dera of Nath yogis in the sanctuary found the ancient rectangular bricks from a 15 feet deep structure after an old banyan tree was uprooted. According to Rajendra Singh Rana, curator of Kurukshetra’s Srikrishna Museum, prima facie these bricks and structure appears to be older than 1500 years old as square bricks are associated with  1,500 years old Gupta period (320 CE to 550 CE) and these bricks are likely to be even older from the Kushan (30 CE to 375 CE) period as the Sarasvati river use to flow here.

There is also a 40 years old water well made of small lakhauri bricks associated with the Mughal empire era.

See also 

 List of National Parks & Wildlife Sanctuaries of Haryana, India
 Haryana Tourism
 List of Monuments of National Importance in Haryana
 List of State Protected Monuments in Haryana
 List of Indus Valley Civilization sites in Haryana, Punjab, Rajasthan, Gujarat, India and Pakistan 
 List of national parks of India
 Wildlife sanctuaries of India 
 Kalesar National Park, 15 km from Yamunanagar
 Sultanpur National Park, 25 km from Gurgaon on Chhachhrauli road	
 Bir Shikargah Wildlife Sanctuary, Pinjore

References

External links 
 List of National Parks, State Wild Life Sanctuaries, Zoos and Parks in Haryana

Wildlife sanctuaries in Haryana
Protected areas of Haryana
Kaithal district
Wetlands of India
Bird sanctuaries of India
1988 establishments in Haryana